NRB Commercial Bank Limited is a third-generation private bank in Bangladesh owned by non-resident Bangladeshis. SM Parvez Tamal is the chairperson of the bank. The Bank is listed on the Dhaka Stock Exchange. Golam Awalia is the CEO and Managing Director of the Bank.

History 
NRB Commercial Bank Limited was established on 2 April 2013. It was launched at Sonargaon Hotel and at the time was the first NRB bank of Bangladesh.

In April 2016, Farasath Ali was re-elected chairman of the bank and Toufique Rahman Chowdhury, founder of Metropolitan University, Sylhet, was reelected vice chairman of the bank.

In October 2017, the Parliamentary Standing Committee on the finance ministry expressed deep concerns over the activities of NRB Commercial Bank Limited and The Farmers Bank Limited and called for protecting them from bankruptcy. An investigation by Bangladesh Bank had found massive irregularities against the two banks. Chairman of NRB Commercial Bank Limited, Farasath Ali, did not attend the meeting of the Parliamentary Standing Committee on the finance ministry. Bangladesh Bank found officials of NRB Commercial Bank Limited guilty of forging the signatures of the bank directors and issuing 7 billion taka of loans violating banking rules. The bank violated policy when it gave loans to Shahidul Ahsan, former chairman of Mercantile Bank. Following the Bangladesh Bank report NRB Commercial Bank Limited removed Farasath Ali as chairman of the bank and replaced him with Tamal SM Parvez in December 2021. The bank also sent it's Managing Director and Chief Executive Office, Dewan Mujibur Rahman, on leave and did not fire him after he secured a court verdict in his favor. Four other officials were removed from the bank. Bangladesh Bank would issue a two year ban against Farasath Ali for irregularities.

In 2018, NRB Commercial Bank Limited was one of the worst performing banks in Bangladesh with high rates of loan defaulting. The same year Khondoker Rashed Maqsood was appointed CEO and Managing Director of the Bank. Under him the bank tried to improve their reputation and make a break from the fiscal scandals.

In 2019 the bank had 71.85 billion taka in deposits and 62.01 billion in loans.

In 2020, Md Mukhter Hossain was appointed CEO and Managing Director of the Bank. A major shareholder of the bank, Mohammad Shahid Islam, was sentenced to jail for human trafficking and money laundering in Kuwait.

NRB Commercial Bank Limited announced plans to go for initial public offering in February 2021. Asia Frontier Capital Limited and Asian Tiger Capital Partners were the IPO managers of the bank. NRB Commercial Bank Limited would be the first bank in 12 years to go for IPO in Bangladesh.

Golam Awalia was appointed the CEO and Managing Director of the Bank in May 2021. In September 2021, Bangladesh Bank fined NRB Commercial Bank Limited for investing more than the allowed limit in the stock market. It imposed another fine worth around half a million taka against NRB Bank for the same reason. In October 2021, NRB Commercial Bank Limited stocks lost significant value index of Dhaka Stock Exchange.

NRB Commercial Bank Limited announced plans to issue 5 billion taka worth of subordinated bonds.

References 

Banks of Bangladesh
Banks established in 2013
2013 establishments in Bangladesh